Metropolitan Leontius (Leonty, secular name Leonid Ieronimovich Turkevich, ; August 8, 1876 in Kremenetz, Volhynia – May 14, 1965) was the Metropolitan of the North American Diocese of the Russian Orthodox Church from 1950 until his death in 1965. He was succeeded by Metropolitan Irenaeus (Bekish).

Leonid Ieronimovich Turkevich was ordained to the priesthood in 1905, and succeeded his father as parish priest of Kremenetz. He was transferred, along with his family, to the United States in October 1906 and became the rector of the newly established Orthodox seminary (St. Platon's) in Minneapolis, Minnesota.  Fr. Leonid represented the American diocese of the Russian Church at the All-Russian Church Council of 1917–1918 in Moscow, Russia.

Fr. Leonid, whose wife had died in 1925, was consecrated Bishop of Chicago in 1933.  He was given the name Leonty during his tonsure as a monastic. Archbishop Leonty was elected Metropolitan of the diocese nearly unanimously during the 8th All-American Sobor, held in December 1950.  He succeeded Metropolitan Theophilus Pashkovsky, who died in June of that year.

In July 1988, Metropolitan Leonty's granddaughter, Tamara Turkevich Skvir, donated 50 bound volumes of diaries and papers covering the period from 1906—1964 to the Library of Congress.  The collection also included approximately 2,000 poems as well as other miscellaneous memoranda and historical documents.

He had five children. John Turkevich (1907 – 1998) was Eugene Higgins Professor of Chemistry at Princeton. Anthony L. Turkevich (1916 – 2002) was a known American radiochemist. Nicholas L. Turkevich (1918 – 2007) was an international advertising executive.

Notes and references

1876 births
1965 deaths
Primates of the Orthodox Church in America
Married Eastern Orthodoxy clergy